Charles Arch Ringo (born June 14, 1958) is an American lawyer and politician from the state of Oregon. He served in both houses of the Oregon Legislative Assembly between 2001 and 2007.

Biography
Ringo was born and raised in Corvallis, Oregon. He graduated with a Bachelor of Science in international affairs and economics from the United States Air Force Academy in 1980 and served in the Air Force from 1980 until 1985. In 1985, Ringo graduated with a Master of Business Administration from Boston University, and with a Juris Doctor from Lewis & Clark Law School in 1989.

Ringo was elected to the Oregon House of Representatives in 2000, defeating Republican John Scruggs and Libertarian Kevin C. Schaumleffle with 51% of the vote. He was elected to the Oregon Senate in 2002, defeating Republican Bill Witt with 55% of the vote. Ringo declined to run for reelection in 2006.

Personal life
Ringo and his wife, Julie, have two children: Reese and Joseph. He is a member of the Episcopal Church.

References

External links

1958 births
Living people
Lewis & Clark Law School alumni
Boston University School of Management alumni
United States Air Force Academy alumni
Democratic Party members of the Oregon House of Representatives
Democratic Party Oregon state senators
Politicians from Corvallis, Oregon
Politicians from Beaverton, Oregon
Oregon lawyers
21st-century American politicians
Military personnel from Oregon